The Mesogeia Painter, also Mesogaia Painter, was an Early Proto-Attic vase painter.

His conventional name is derived from his name vases, several hydriai decorated by him and discovered in the Mesogeia. This Early Proto-Attic artist was a contemporary of the Analatos Painter, active in the first quarter of the seventh century BC. It has been suggested that he was a pupil of the Late Geometric Statathou Painter, and the teacher of the High Proto-Attic Polyphemos Painter.

Literature 
 Thomas Mannack in Griechische Vasenmalerei. Eine Einführung, Theiss, Stuttgart 2002, p. 135 
 Cynthia King: More Pots by the Mesogeia Painter, in: American Journal of Archaeology, Vol 80 (1976), p. 79-82

See also
 List of Greek vase painters
 Orientalizing period
 Pottery of ancient Greece

7th-century BC Greek people
Ancient Greek vase painters
Anonymous artists of antiquity
People from Attica